Scaptesyle tetramita is a moth in the subfamily Arctiinae first described by Turner in 1940. It is found in Australia.

References

Lithosiini